Gloria Peritore (born 29 November 1988) is an Italian kickboxer and mixed martial artist. She is the current ISKA World Flyweight Kickboxing and Oriental Rules champion. As of October 2022, she is ranked as the tenth best pound-for-pound women's kickboxer in the world by Beyond Kick.

Mixed martial arts career
Peritore made her mixed martial arts debut against Claudia Archir at Luctor Cage Fight - Luctor 2017 on 8 July 2017. She won the fight by a first-round submission.

Peritore faced Giulia Chinello at Fight1 - Iron Fighter 20 on 10 November 2018, fifteen months after her previous fight. She lost the bout by a first-round technical knockout.

Kickboxing career

Early career
Peritore made her professional debut in early 2013. She amassed an 8-0 record during the next two years, most notably beating Marzia Vadalà by unanimous decision twice.

Her undefeated streak earned Peritore the chance to challenge the ISKA European Full Contact Kickboxing Flyweight champion Lizzie Largillière at La Nuit de l'Impact on 16 May 2015. She lost the fight by split decision.

Bellator Kickboxing
Peritore made her professional debut with Bellator Kickboxing against Li Mingrui at Bellator Kickboxing 1 on 16 April 2016. She won the fight by a third-round technical knockout.

Following a split decision loss to Jleana Valentino at La Notte dei Campioni on 14 May 2016, Peritore was scheduled to face the former Enfusion champion Denise Kielholtz at Bellator 157 on 24 June 2016. She won the fight by split decision.

Due to the close nature of their first meeting, an immediate rematch between Peritore and Denise Kielholtz was booked for Bellator 168 on 10 December 2016. Kielholtz was more successful in their second meeting, as she won the bout by split decision.

Pertiore's next fight took place outside of Bellator, as she faced the pound for pound queen Anissa Meksen at La Nuit De L'Impact III on 20 May 2017. She suffered her fourth professional loss, as Meksen won the bout by unanimous decision.

Peritore faced Lara Fernandez at War of Titans on 23 September 2017. She won the fight by unanimous decision.

Peritore faced Lizzie Largillière in a rematch at Bellator 190 on 9 December 2017. She won the fight by unanimous decision.

Peritore faced Martine Michieletto at Bellator 203 on 14 July 2018, in her fifth and final appearance with the promotion. She lost the fight by unanimous decision.

Peritore returned from an almost year-long absence in order to face Ilaria Pizzuti at Fight Clubbing on 4 May 2019. She won the fight by a second-round technical knockout. After beating Eleni Katsimicha by unanimous decision on 23 October 2019, Peritore was booked to face the K-1 Women's Flyweight champion Kana Morimoto in a non-title bout at K'Festa 3 on 22 March 2020. She lost the fight by a first-round knockout, after being dropped with a right hook with 18 seconds left in the round.

ISKA Oriental flyweight champion
Peritore challenged for the ISKA World Oriental Rules title at Road to Lion Fight: Sofokleus vs. Carrara in August 2020, which was held at the time by Ludivine Lasnier. Peritore won the title by a unanimous decision.

She was scheduled to fight Sonia Dinh at The Arena 3 on 27 March 2021. Peritore won the fight by unanimous decision.

Peritore was booked to face Mariza Korogiannou for the WKU FCR 55kg title at The Arena: No Surrender on 26 March 2022. She won the fight by unanimous decision.

Peritore made her first ISKA World Oriental Rules title defense against Mireia García at Superfights II on 17 June 2022. She retained the title, as the fight was ruled a draw.

Professional boxing career
Peritore made her professional boxing debut, as a bantamweight, against Chiara Insarrualde on March 24, 2023, at the Allianz Cloud Arena in Milan, Italy.

Championships and accomplishments

Professional
Italian Kickboxing Federation
2015 Italian National Kickboxing Championship
2016 Slam 4 Women Flyweight Tournament Winner
International Sport Karate Association
2020 ISKA World Oriental Rules Flyweight Championship
One successful title defense
World Kickboxing and Karate Union
2021 WKU FCR World -55kg Championship

Amateur
FederKombat
2012 Italian National Amateur Kickboxing Championship
World Traditional Kickboxing Association
2012 WTKA Amateur World Kickboxing Championship
International Sport Karate Association
2013 ISKA Amateur World K1 Championship
2014 ISKA Amateur World Kickboxing Championship

Kickboxing record

|-  bgcolor="#c5d2ea"
| 2022-06-17 || Draw ||align=left| Mireia García || Superfights II || Rome, Italy || Decision (Unanimous) || 5 || 3:00
|-
! style=background:white colspan=9 |
|-  bgcolor="#cfc"
| 2022-03-26 || Win ||align=left| Mariza Korogiannou || The Arena: No Surrender|| Milan, Italy || Decision (Unanimous) || 5 || 3:00
|-
! style=background:white colspan=9 |
|-  bgcolor="#cfc"
| 2021-03-27 ||Win ||align=left| Sonia Dinh || The Arena 3 || Pescara, Italy || Decision (Unanimous) || 3 || 3:00
|-  bgcolor="#cfc"
| 2020-08-29 ||Win ||align=left| Ludivine Lasnier || Road to Lion Fight: Sofokleus vs. Carrara || Rosolini, Italy || Decision (Unanimous) || 5 || 3:00
|-
! style=background:white colspan=9 |
|-  bgcolor="#fbb"
| 2020-03-22 || Loss ||align=left| Kana Morimoto || K'Festa 3 || Tokyo, Japan || KO (Right hook) || 1 || 2:42
|-  bgcolor="#cfc"
| 2019-10-23 ||Win ||align=left| Eleni Katsimicha || Night of Siam || Pisa, Italy || Decision (Unanimous) || 3 || 3:00
|-  bgcolor="#cfc"
| 2019-05-04 ||Win ||align=left| Ilaria Pizzuti || Fight Clubbing || Pescara, Italy || TKO || 2 || 1:29
|-  bgcolor="#fbb"
| 2018-07-14 || Loss ||align=left| Martine Michieletto || Bellator 203 || Rome, Italy || Decision (Unanimous) || 3 || 3:00
|-  bgcolor="#cfc"
| 2017-12-09 ||Win ||align=left| Lizzie Largillière || Bellator 190 || Florence, Italy || Decision (Unanimous) || 3 || 3:00
|-  bgcolor="#cfc"
| 2017-09-23 ||Win ||align=left| Lara Fernandez || War Of Titans || Barcelona, Spain || Decision (Unanimous) || 5 || 3:00
|-  bgcolor="#fbb"
| 2017-05-20 || Loss ||align=left| Anissa Meksen || La Nuit De L'Impact III || Saintes, France || Decision (Unanimous) || 3 || 3:00
|-  bgcolor="#fbb"
| 2016-12-10 || Loss ||align=left| Denise Kielholtz || Bellator 168 || Florence, Italy || Decision (Split) || 3 || 3:00
|-  bgcolor="#cfc"
| 2016-06-24 ||Win ||align=left| Denise Kielholtz || Bellator 157 || St.Louis, Missouri || Decision (Split) || 3 || 3:00
|-  bgcolor="#fbb"
| 2016-05-14 || Loss ||align=left| Jleana Valentino || La Notte dei Campioni  || Seregno, Italy || Decision (Split) || 3 || 3:00
|-  bgcolor="#cfc"
| 2016-04-16 ||Win ||align=left| Li Mingrui || Bellator Kickboxing 1 || Torino, Italy || TKO (Punches) || 3 ||
|-  bgcolor="#cfc"
| 2016-03-16 ||Win ||align=left| Marzia Vadalà || Muay Thai Time: Iron Fight, Tournament Finals || Genoa, Italy || Decision (Unanimous) || 3 || 3:00
|-
! style=background:white colspan=9 |
|-  bgcolor="#cfc"
| 2016-03-16 ||Win ||align=left| Miriam Vivarini || Muay Thai Time: Iron Fight, Tournament Semifinals || Genoa, Italy || Decision (Unanimous) || 3 || 3:00
|-  bgcolor="#fbb"
| 2015-11-21 || Loss ||align=left| Ruth Ashdown || Muaythai Mayhem || Copthorne, West Sussex, United Kingdom || Decision (Unanimous) || 3 || 3:00
|-  bgcolor="#fbb"
| 2015-05-16 || Loss ||align=left| Lizzie Largillière || La Nuit de l'Impact || Saintes, Charente-Maritime, France || Decision (Split) || 5 || 3:00
|-
! style=background:white colspan=9 |
|-  bgcolor="#cfc"
| 2015-04-11 ||Win ||align=left| Marzia Vadalà || Oktagon: Petrosyan vs Kehl || Milan, Italy || Decision (Unanimous) || 3 || 3:00
|-  bgcolor="#cfc"
| 2015-03-07 ||Win ||align=left| Aicha Amarhoun ||  || Cento, Italy || Decision (Unanimous) || 3 || 3:00
|-  bgcolor="#cfc"
| 2014-12 ||Win ||align=left| Sara Falchetti ||  || Italy || Decision (Unanimous) || 3 || 3:00
|-  bgcolor="#cfc"
| 2014-07-07 ||Win ||align=left| Michela Galli || Oktagon Selections 2015 || Italy || Decision (Unanimous) || 3 || 3:00
|-  bgcolor="#cfc"
| 2014 ||Win ||align=left| Marzia Vadalà ||  || Italy || Decision (Unanimous) || 3 || 3:00
|-
| colspan=9 | Legend:    

|-  style="background:#CCFFCC;"
| 2014-05- || Win ||align=left| Laura Tower || ISKA World Championships, Tournament Final || || Decision || 3 || 2:00
|-
! style=background:white colspan=9 |
|-
|-  style="background:#CCFFCC;"
| 2014-05- || Win ||align=left| Luana Perugini || ISKA World Championships, Tournament Semifinal ||  || Decision || 3 || 2:00
|-
| colspan=9 | Legend:

Mixed martial arts record
 

|-
|Loss
|align=center|1–1
|Giulia Chinello
|TKO (Punches)
|Fight1 - Iron Fighter 20
|
|align=center|1
|align=center|2:04
|Pordenone, Italy
|
|-
|Win
|align=center|1–0
|Claudia Archir
|Submission (Rear-Naked Choke)
|Luctor Cage Fight - Luctor 2017
|
|align=center|1
|align=center|1:57
|Pistoia, Italy
|
|-

See also
 List of female kickboxers

References

1989 births
Living people
Sportspeople from the Province of Agrigento
Italian female kickboxers
Flyweight kickboxers
People from Licata